Arthur Silvanus "Archie" Snell (30 July 1877 – 18 July 1949) was an Australian rules footballer who played for the Carlton Football Club and Essendon Football Club in the Victorian Football League (VFL).

Notes

External links 

		
Archie Snell's profile at Blueseum

1877 births
1949 deaths
Australian rules footballers from Victoria (Australia)
Carlton Football Club players
Essendon Football Club players
People from Dromana, Victoria